Ceder may refer to:
 Ralph Ceder (1898 - 1951), American film director and writer
 Ulf Ceder (born 1974), Finnish darts player
 Jurgen Ceder, Belgian politician and a member of Vlaams Belang
 Don Ceder, Dutch politician and a member of the ChristianUnion 

Germanic-language surnames
Swedish-language surnames
Jewish surnames
Surnames of Polish origin